Safrina is a genus of stag beetles that are endemic to Australia.

References

External links 
 iNaturalist

Lucaninae
Lucanidae genera